Ronald David Ekers  (born 18 September 1941) FRS FAA is an Australian radio astronomer. His fields of specialty include the study of active galactic nuclei, cosmology, and radio astronomy techniques.

Ron Ekers was born in Victor Harbor, South Australia. He showed interest in astronomy at a young age.

Ron Ekers graduated from the University of Adelaide in 1963 and received his PhD in astronomy at the Australian National University (ANU) in 1967. His postdoctoral supervisor at ANU was the astronomer John Gatenby Bolton. After graduating from ANU, his first postdoctoral studies were performed at Caltech, during which time Richard P. Feynman and Fred Hoyle were active. 
 
He was director of the Very Large Array (VLA) from 1980 until 1987.  From 1988 to 2003 he was Foundation Director of CSIRO's Australia Telescope National Facility. In 2002 he was awarded a prestigious Federation Fellowship. He is a past President of the International Astronomical Union (IAU) (2003–2006) and a member of the Advisory Board for the Peter Gruber Foundation Cosmology Prize.

Honours and awards
He was elected a Fellow of the Australian Academy of Science, a Foreign Member of the Royal Netherlands Academy of Arts and Sciences in 1993, a Foreign Member of the American Philosophical Society in 2003, a Fellow of the Royal Society in 2005, and a Foreign Associate of the US National Academy of Sciences in 2018.

2014 Grote Reber Gold Medal for innovative and significant contributions to radio astronomy 
2005 Matthew Flinders Medal and Lecture, Australian Academy of Science
1993 Centenary Medal (Australia)

References

External links
Ron Ekers' homepage
Interview with Ron Ekers on Australian National Radio
Interview for the Australian Astronomers Oral History Project

1941 births
Living people
20th-century Australian astronomers
Australian National University alumni
Fellows of the Australian Academy of Science
Officers of the Order of Australia
Australian Fellows of the Royal Society
Members of the Royal Netherlands Academy of Arts and Sciences
Foreign associates of the National Academy of Sciences
Members of the American Philosophical Society
21st-century Australian astronomers
Presidents of the International Astronomical Union